Zhang Gong (born July 1935) is a general in the People's Liberation Army of China who served as political commissar of the Beijing Military Region from 1990 to 1992, political commissar of the Chengdu Military Region from 1992 to 1993, and political commissar of the PLA Academy of Military Science from 1993 to 2000.

He was a representative of the 13th National Congress of the Chinese Communist Party. He was a member of the 14th and 15th Central Committee of the Chinese Communist Party. He was a delegate to the 7th National People's Congress. He was a member of the Standing Committee of the 10th Chinese People's Political Consultative Conference.

Biography
Zhang was born in Guo County (now Yuanping), Shanxi, in July 1935. He enlisted in the People's Liberation Army (PLA) in July 1951, and joined the Chinese Communist Party (CCP) in December 1961. He served in the Beijing Military Region (formerly known as North China Military Region) since June 1952, becoming director of Political Department in June 1985 and political commissar in April 1990. He was commissioned as political commissar of the Chengdu Military Region in November 1992, he remained in that position until December 1993, when he was transferred to the PLA Academy of Military Science and given the position of political commissar.

He was promoted to the rank of major general (shaojiang) in September 1988, lieutenant general (zhongjiang) in July 1990, and general (shangjiang) in March 1998.

References

1935 births
Living people
People from Yuanping
People's Liberation Army generals from Shanxi
Political commissars of the Beijing Military Region
Political commissars of the Chengdu Military Region
People's Republic of China politicians from Shanxi
Chinese Communist Party politicians from Shanxi
Members of the 14th Central Committee of the Chinese Communist Party
Members of the 15th Central Committee of the Chinese Communist Party
Delegates to the 7th National People's Congress
Members of the Standing Committee of the 10th Chinese People's Political Consultative Conference